The rusty crayfish (Faxonius rusticus) is a large, aggressive species of freshwater crayfish which is native to the United States, in the Ohio River Basin in parts of Ohio, Kentucky, and Indiana. Its range is rapidly expanding across much of eastern North America, displacing native crayfishes in the process. The rusty crayfish was first captured in Illinois in 1973, and has been collected at over 20 locations in the northern portion of the state. In 2005, F. rusticus was found for the first time west of the Continental Divide, in the John Day River, Oregon, which runs into the Columbia River.

Description

Adult rusty crayfish can reach 10 centimeters (4 inches) in length, although they reach maturity at about 4.4 cm (1.7 in), and can range in color from greenish grey, to reddish brown, They can be easily recognized by two "rusty", reddish colored spots on the sides of their back and their large front claws with black bands around the tips. Male rusty crayfish have small hook-like features on their first pair of hind legs that they use to hold onto a female while mating.

Behavior

Many species of vertebrates that live in communities together utilize a dominance hierarchy to establish order, and studies have shown that some species of invertebrates do as well. The dominance hierarchy is an important aspect of a crayfish's biology and behavior. Crayfish tend to form dominance hierarchies with the other members of their population in a particular environment. The largest male will generally demonstrate the most dominance over the others by being the most aggressive, and picking fights with the other, smaller crayfish. The crayfish that wins the most fights is placed at the top of the hierarchy with the other members generally ranking in descending order based on size and sex. Studies have suggested that the largest determining factor in the formation of dominance hierarchies is size rather than sex. That means that female rusty crayfish can rank higher in the dominance hierarchy than male rusty crayfish if they are larger than them.

As an invasive species
The larger size and aggressive nature of rusty crayfish that have been introduced to a body of water makes it harder for them to be preyed upon by native species of fish, which are not accustomed to crayfish fighting them back. Instead of running away like the native crayfish species do when they come in contact with a predator, the rusty crayfish will take an attack stance with its claws raised above its head, which will generally scare away most predatory fish. Additionally, adult rusty crayfish can be too large for some fish to consume. Because the rusty crayfish are able to avoid predators fairly well, their population in these new aquatic ecosystems was able to grow extremely quickly and within twenty years the rusty crayfish population had exploded and become an invasive species in the Northern United States and parts of Canada. Because these rusty crayfish populations have basically taken over the natives species' habitats and forced them out of their homes, many populations of native crayfish have experienced drastic decline over the past fifty years and the rusty crayfish has become the dominant species in much of the Midwestern United States.

Control efforts
There are some chemicals that will selectively kill only crayfish that have not been registered or labeled for crayfish control, but kill all species of crayfish and are not specific to rusty crayfish. Manual harvest for human consumption is an effective control strategy due to the large size of rusty crayfish. However, this strategy is only useful in reducing the adult population. Once a population of rusty crayfish is introduced to a body of water, it is very difficult to completely eradicate them. Therefore, the best control strategy is to try to prevent any further spread of the rusty crayfish. The best ways to prevent invasive species spread is to learn to identify the invasive species, and not use the species as bait or transport the species to bodies of water where it is not already present.

References

Cambaridae
Fauna of the United States
Freshwater crustaceans of North America
Crustaceans described in 1852